Hydrogenases are enzymes that catalyze the reversible activation of hydrogen and which occur widely in prokaryotes as well as in some eukaryotes. There are various types of hydrogenases, but all of them seem to contain at least one iron-sulphur cluster. They can be broadly divided into two groups: hydrogenases containing nickel and, in some cases, also selenium (the [NiFe] and [NiFeSe] hydrogenases) and those lacking nickel (the [Fe] hydrogenases).

The [NiFe] and [NiFeSe] hydrogenases are heterodimer that consist of a small subunit that contains a signal peptide and a large subunit. All the known large subunits seem to be evolutionary related; they contain two Cys-x-x-Cys motifs; one at their N-terminal end; the other at their C-terminal end. These four cysteines are involved in the binding of nickel. In the [NiFeSe] hydrogenases the first cysteine of the C-terminal motif is a selenocysteine which has experimentally been shown to be a nickel ligand.

References

Protein domains
Enzymes